James L. Berry (born circa 1955), known professionally as Jim Berry, is a news anchor for the CBS affiliate in Miami, Florida, and was a longtime sports anchor and reporter for various television stations.  He has won five Emmy awards for his news and sports reporting.

Early life and education 

A native of Chicago who grew up in the city's Hyde Park neighborhood, Berry earned a bachelor's degree in 1977 from Northwestern University's Medill School of Journalism. Jim is a member of Alpha Phi Alpha fraternity.

Professional career 

Berry began his career at WBTV-TV in Charlotte, North Carolina, where he started as a reporter trainee and progressed to being a weekend anchor.  Berry then joined WJLA-TV in Washington, D.C. as a weekend anchor before switching to the sports desk.

Berry then joined WSVN-TV in Miami as a sports director, where he worked for six years.  In April 1994, Berry joined WBBM-TV in Chicago as a sports anchor.

In August 1996, Berry joined WFOR-TV in Miami as the station's sports director.  In June 2008, Berry shifted to being a morning news anchor at WFOR.

Personal 

Berry and his wife, Cheryl Annette Mattox Berry, have two children.  They live in Palmetto Bay, Florida.

References

External links 
 WFOR-TV Profile

1950s births
Living people
American television reporters and correspondents
Medill School of Journalism alumni
Television anchors from Miami
Year of birth uncertain
American male journalists
People from Palmetto Bay, Florida